Jazink District is a district (bakhsh) in Zehak County, Sistan and Baluchestan Province, Iran. At the 2006 census, its population was 21,026, in 4,644 families.  The District is entirely rural.

References 

Zehak County
Districts of Sistan and Baluchestan Province